Nikos (Nikolaos) Goulandris (1913–1983) was a Greek businessman and president of Olympiacos F.C.

Goulandris started his involvement with Olympiacos in 1970, becoming its general manager in 1971 and ultimately its president in 1972.  As president, he reinstated all the prominent members of Olympiacos board that had been forced out by the military regime (including Giorgos Andrianopoulos) and opened-up the member election process, establishing a new, trustworthy board of directors. He appointed Lakis Petropoulos as head coach and signed top-class players, creating a great roster. Under Goulandris' presidency, Olympiacos won the Greek Championship three times in a row (1972–73, 1973–74, 1974–75), combining it with the Greek Cup in 1973 and 1975 to celebrate two Doubles in three years. Ιn the 1972–73 season, Olympiacos won the title by conceding only 13 goals in 34 matches, which is an-all-time record in Greek football history. The team's best year though, was undoubtedly the 1973–74 season, when Olympiacos won the league with 26 wins and 7 draws in 34 games, scoring an all-time record of 102 goals and conceding only 14.

Nikos Goulandris is widely considered as one of the greatest presidents in Olympiakos' history. He died in 1983; legend says that his final words were: 

The "Nikolaos Goulandris" plaque, given to supporters of Olympiacos F.C., is named in his honour.

References

Olympiacos F.C. presidents
Nikos
Greek businesspeople in shipping
1913 births
1983 deaths
People from Andros